Thokozani Calvin Sosibo (born 15 March 1985 in South Africa) is a South African retired footballer.

Career

Sosibo started his career with Kaizer Chiefs, one of the most successful teams in South Africa, before being sent on loan to Maritzburg United.

In 2009, he signed for MKE Ankaragücü in the Turkish top flight, enjoying the passion of the fans there. However, Sosibo was never paid a full salary during his time there.

In 2011, he returned to Maritzburg United before retiring.

References

External links
 Calvin Sosibo at Footballdatabase.eu

South African soccer players
Living people
Association football forwards
Association football midfielders
Association football wingers
1985 births
MKE Ankaragücü footballers
Maritzburg United F.C. players